Samuel Prescott Bush  (October 4, 1863 – February 8, 1948) was an American businessman and industrialist. Bush was the patriarch of the Bush political family. He was the father of U.S. Senator Prescott Bush, the paternal grandfather of former U.S. President George H. W. Bush, and patrilineal great-grandfather of former Texas Governor and President George W. Bush and former Florida Governor Jeb Bush.

Early life
Bush was born in Brick Church, Orange, New Jersey, to Harriet Eleanor Fay (1829–1924) and Reverend James Smith Bush (1825–1889), an Episcopal priest at Grace Church in Orange. His siblings were James Freeman Bush (1860–1913), Harold Montfort Bush (1871–1945), and Eleanor Bush Woods (1872–1957).
 
He grew up in New Jersey, San Francisco, and Staten Island, but spent the majority of his adult life in Columbus, Ohio.

Career
Bush graduated from the Stevens Institute of Technology at Hoboken, New Jersey in 1884, where he played on one of the earliest regular college football teams. He took an apprenticeship with the Pittsburgh, Cincinnati, Chicago and St. Louis Railroad at the Logansport, Indiana shops, later transferring to Dennison, Ohio and Columbus, Ohio, where in 1891 he became Master Mechanic, then in 1894 Superintendent of Motive Power. In 1899, he moved to Milwaukee, Wisconsin to take the position of Superintendent of Motive Power with the Chicago, Milwaukee & St. Paul Railroad.

In 1901, Bush returned to Columbus to be general manager of Buckeye Steel Castings Company, which manufactured railway parts. The company was run by Frank Rockefeller, the brother of oil magnate John D. Rockefeller, and among its clients were the railroads controlled by E. H. Harriman. The Bush and Harriman families would be closely associated at least until the end of World War II. In 1908, Rockefeller retired and Bush became president of Buckeye, a position he would hold until 1927, becoming one of the top industrialists of his generation.

Bush was the first president of the Ohio Manufacturers Association, and cofounder of the Columbus Academy. Additionally, he was the co-founder of the Scioto Country Club, a golf club in Columbus, Ohio.

Political prominence
In the spring of 1918, banker Bernard Baruch was asked to reorganize the War Industries Board during World War I, and placed several prominent businessmen to key posts. Bush became chief of the Ordnance, Small Arms, and Ammunition Section, with national responsibility for government assistance to and relations with munitions companies.

Bush served on the board of the Federal Reserve Bank of Cleveland (as well as of the Huntington National Bank of Columbus). In 1931, he was appointed to Herbert Hoover's President's Committee for Unemployment Relief, chaired by Walter S. Gifford, then-President of AT&T. He was once recommended to serve on the board of the Reconstruction Finance Corporation, but Hoover did not feel he was sufficiently known nationally.

Personal life
On June 20, 1894, he married Flora Sheldon (1872–1920), the daughter of Robert Emmet Sheldon (1845–1917) and Mary Elizabeth Butler (1850–1897). Her maternal grandfather was Courtland Philip Livingston Butler (1812–1891), a member of the Livingston family.  Together, they had five children:

 Prescott Sheldon Bush (1895–1972), a US Senator, who married Dorothy Walker (1901–1992), daughter of George Herbert Walker; he was the father of President George Herbert Walker Bush and grandfather of President George Walker Bush.
 Robert Sheldon Bush (1896–1900), who died in childhood
 Mary Eleanor Bush (1897–2001), who married Francis "Frank" House
 Margaret Livingston Bush (1899–1993), who married Stuart Holmes Clement (1895–1974) in 1919.
 James Smith Bush (1901–1978), a director of the Export–Import Bank, and president of the Northwest International Bank.

His wife, Flora, died on September 4, 1920 in Narragansett, Rhode Island, when she was hit by a car. He later married Martha Bell Carter (1879–1950) of Milwaukee, Wisconsin.

Bush died on February 8, 1948, aged 84, in Columbus. He is interred at Green Lawn Cemetery, Columbus, Ohio.

References

External links
Samuel Bush residence

1863 births
1948 deaths
Bolling family of Virginia
Bush family
Businesspeople from New Jersey
Businesspeople from Columbus, Ohio
People from East Orange, New Jersey
Stevens Institute of Technology alumni
People from Dennison, Ohio
American chief executives
American steel industry businesspeople
Stevens Tech Ducks football
Burials at Green Lawn Cemetery (Columbus, Ohio)